Toontown is a common placename for a fictional place where cartoon characters (toons) reside.

Toontown may also refer to:

Disney 
 Mickey Mouse universe, a fictional shared universe which is the setting for stories involving Disney cartoon characters
 Toontown, a fictional city in the 1988 film Who Framed Roger Rabbit
 Mickey's Toontown, a themed land at Disneyland and Tokyo Disneyland
 Toontown Online, a now-defunct 2003 Disney video game

Other 
 "Toontown", a nickname for Saskatoon, a city in Canada

Fictional locations of Disney